Saint Luke is a 2.73 m high bronze statue of Luke the Evangelist by Giambologna, commissioned by the Arte dei Giudici e Notai and completed in 1597–1602. One of a cycle of fourteen commissioned by the guilds of Florence for the external niches of Orsanmichele, it is now in the Museo di Orsanmichele, although a replica fills its original niche.

Bibliography
 Paola Grifoni, Francesca Nannelli, Le statue dei santi protettori delle arti fiorentine e il Museo di Orsanmichele, Quaderni del servizio educativo, Edizioni Polistampa, Florence, 2006 (Italian).

Bronze sculptures in Florence
Sculptures by Giambologna
Luke
Sculptures depicting New Testament people
Books in art
Giambologna
1600s sculptures